Shigu Town is an urban town in Xiangtan County, Hunan Province, People's Republic of China. 
 it had a population of 49,645 and an area of

Administrative division
The town is divided into 1 villages and 34 community, the following areas: Daqiao Community, Dingfeng Village, Tongliang Village, Shuanghe Village, Shantianchong Village, Qunxing Village, Xiema Village, Dapingtai Village, Yanhong Village, Zhutang Village, Lukou Village, Yunxia Village, Shihutang Village, Fuxiao Village, Gaojiaping Village, Xichong Village, Hualou Village, Hairong Village, Shigu Village, Wanjia Village, Zhushan Village, Ouchong Village, Jiangjun Village, Anle Village, Xingwang Village, Sushanzui Village, Senmei Village, Longduan Village, Daoguan Village, Zhulian Village, Xiangyang Village, Qijiaping Village, Taipingshan Village, Wujiazui Village, and Silu Village.

Geography
Chang Mountain and Tongliang Mountain are scenic spots in the town.

Tongliang Reservoir, was built in 1958. Xiangshuitan Reservoir, Shiyi Reservoir, Jiangjun Reservoir, Chishuituo Reservoir and Batang Reservoir are located in the town.

Economy
The region abounds with marble.

Sweet potato is important to the economy.

Education
There are 14 primary schools, 3 Middle schools located with the town.

Culture
Huaguxi is the most influence local theater.

References

External links

Divisions of Xiangtan County